Ata Malifa (born 10 September 1985 in American Samoa) is an American rugby union fly-half. He previously played for the Colorado Raptors in Major League Rugby (MLR) and briefly for the USA Eagles.

He is the twin brother of Nese Malifa.

Malifa's family moved to Auckland, New Zealand when he was 14. he later played for Bay of Plenty.

References

Living people
1985 births
American Samoan rugby union players
American Raptors players
United States international rugby union players
Rugby union fly-halves
United States international rugby sevens players
American rugby union players
Rugby union centres
Denver Stampede players